The governor of Manipur is the nominal head and representative of the president of India in the state of Manipur. The governor is appointed by the president for a term of five years. The current and 17th governor of Manipur is Anusuiya Uikey appointed by President Droupadi Murmu on 12 February 2023.

Governors of Manipur

See also
 Manipur
 Chief Minister of Manipur
 Governors of India

References
7. https://www.thehindu.com/news/national/other-       states/sikkim-governor-sworn-in-as-governor-in-charge-of-manipur/article35875622.ece

External links
 

 
Manipur
Governors